The information regarding List of rivers in the Atacama Region on this page has been compiled from the data supplied by GeoNames. It includes all features named "Rio", "Canal", "Arroyo", "Estero" and those Feature Code is associated with a stream of water. This list contains 61 water streams.

Content
This list contains:
 Name of the stream, in Spanish Language
 Coordinates are latitude and longitude of the feature in ± decimal degrees, at the mouth of the stream
 Link to a map including the Geonameid (a number which uniquely identifies a Geoname feature)
 Feature Code explained in 
 Other names for the same feature, if any
 Basin countries additional to Chile, if any

List

  Quebrada Rio SecoQuebrada Río Seco3873100STMI
  Rio de la SalRío de la Sal3872619STMI
  Rio SaladoRío Salado3872599STMI
  Rio SaladoRío Salado3872602STM
  Rio de La SalRío de La Sal3884658STM
  Rio de la SalRío de la Sal3872620STM
  Rio La OlaRío La Ola3885197STMI(Quebrada de La Ola, Quebrada de la Ola, Rio La Ola, Rio Ola, Rio de La Ola, Rio de la Ola, Río La Ola, Río Ola, Río de La Ola, Río de la Ola)
  Rio JuncalitoRío Juncalito3886709STMI
  Rio SaladoRío Salado3872598STMI
  Rio Pastos LargosRío Pastos Largos3877043STMI(Rio Pastos Largas, Rio Pastos Largos, Río Pastos Largas, Río Pastos Largos)(CL)
  Río Dulce3892160STMI(Arroyo Dulce, Estero Dulce)
  Rio ColoradoRío Colorado3894022STMI
  Rio LamasRío Lamas3885376STMI(Rio Lama, Rio Lamas, Río Lama, Río Lamas)
  Rio LajitasRío Lajitas3885555STMI
  Rio CopiapoRío Copiapó3893651STM(Rio Copiapo, Río Copiapó)
  Rio ManflasRío Manflas3880722STM(Rio Manflas, Rio Manflias, Río Manflas)
  Rio JorqueraRío Jorquera3886836STM
  Rio FigueroaRío Figueroa3889513STM
  Rio TurbioRío Turbio (Copiapó)3868888STM
  Rio TurbioRío Turbio3868889STM
  Río Piuquenes3875720STM(Quebrada Piuquenes, Quebrada Piuquenes, Rio Piuquenes, Río Piuquenes)
  Rio de la GallinaRío de la Gallina3889170STM(Rio La Gallina, Rio de la Gallina, Río La Gallina, Río de la Gallina)
  Rio NevadoRío Nevado3878711STM
  Río CachitosRío Cachitos3897498STM(Rio Cachito, Rio Cachitos, Rio Chacrita, Río Cachito, Rïo Cachitos)
  Rio BayoRío Bayo3898550STMI
  Rio AstaburuagaRío Astaburuaga3899215STM
  Río Paredones3877182STM(Quebrada Paredones, Rio Paredones, Río Paredones)
  Río La Laguna3885522STMI(Estero La Laguna, Estero de la Laguna)
  Rio Aguas BlancasRío Aguas Blancas3900433STM
  Rio PlazaRío Plaza3875636STM
  Río Come Caballos3893960STM(Arroyo Come Caballos, Estero Come Caballos)(CL)
  Rio PulidoRío Pulido3874887STM
  Rio Vizcachas de PulidoRío Vizcachas de Pulido3868003STM
  Rio Pircas ColoradasRío Pircas Coloradas3875823STM
  Rio MontosaRío Montosa3879406STM Rio Montoso
  Rio RamadillasRío Ramadillas3873803STM
  Rio RamadasRío Ramadas3873818STM
  Rio PotroRío Potro3875254STM
  Rio de Las Pircas de MondacaRío de Las Pircas de Mondaca3884005STM
  Rio del MedioRío del Medio3880160STM
  Quebrada del Medio3880163STM(Quebrada del Medio, Rio del Medio, Río del Medio)
  Río Tolar3869696STM
  Rio del ToroRío del Toro3869541STM
  Rio HuascoRío Huasco3887753STM(Rio Guasco, Rio Huasco, Río Huasco)
  Rio del TransitoRío del Tránsito3869299STM(Rio El Transito, Rio del Transito, Río El Tránsito, Río del Tránsito)
  Rio ConayRío Conay3893900STM(Rio Conai, Rio Conay, Río Conai, Río Conay)
  Rio ChollayRío Chollay3894880STM(Rio Cholay, Rio Chollai, Rio Chollay, Río Cholay, Río Chollai, Río Chollay)
  Río Blanco3898238STMI(Arroyo Blanco, Estero Blanco)
  Rio del CarmenRío del Carmen3896600STM
  Rio del MedioRío del Medio3880159STM
  Rio SancarronRío Sancarrón3872312STM
  Rio del Toro6324661STM
  Rio PrimeroRío Primero3875170STM
  Rio Laguna GrandeRío Laguna Grande3885766STM
  Quebrada Rio de ColloQuebrada Río de Collo3873135STMI
  Rio del CazaderoRío del Cazadero3896053STM(Rio Cazadero, Rio del Cazadero, Río Cazadero, Río del Cazadero)
  Rio Laguna ChicaRío Laguna Chica3885772STM
  Rio de ValerianoRío de Valeriano3868671STM(Arroyo Valeriana, Rio Valeriano, Rio de Valeriano, Río Valeriano, Río de Valeriano)
  Rio PlataRío Plata3875662STM
  Arroyo Valeriana3868673STM
  Rio PotrerilloRío Potrerillo3875324STM
  Rio Tres QuebradasRío Tres Quebradas3869139STM
  Rio ElquiRío Elqui3890618STM(Rio Elaui, Rio Elqui, Río Elaui, Río Elqui)

See also
 List of lakes in Chile
 List of volcanoes in Chile
 List of islands of Chile
 List of fjords, channels, sounds and straits of Chile
 List of lighthouses in Chile

Notes

References

External links
 Rivers of Chile
 Base de Datos Hidrográfica de Chile
 

Atacama